Branigan is the debut studio album by American singer Laura Branigan, released in March 1982 by Atlantic Records. The album's lead single, "All Night with Me", reached number 69 on the US Billboard Hot 100, while the second single, an English version of Italian singer Umberto Tozzi's song "Gloria", was a commercial success, propelling Branigan to international prominence.

The album was certified Gold in both the United States and Canada. Her Euro disco version of "Gloria" was nominated for a Grammy Award for Best Pop Vocal Performance, Female in 1983.

A remastered and expanded edition of the album was released on July 7, 2014, by Gold Legion. Included is the extended 12″ version of "Gloria" and several hard to find tracks from the album sessions, all but one of which were released as singles or B-sides prior to the release of the final album.

Track listing

Personnel
Credits adapted from the liner notes of Branigan.

Musicians

 Laura Branigan – vocals
 Michael Landau – guitar
 Steve Lukather – guitar
 Trevor Veitch – guitar
 Greg Mathieson – keyboards, synthesizer, arrangements
 Leland Sklar – bass
 Bob Glaub – bass
 Carlos Vega – drums
 Michael Boddicker – synthesizer
 Jon Joyce – background vocals
 Joe Chemay – background vocals
 Jim Haas – background vocals
 Stephanie Spruill – background vocals
 Maxine Willard Waters – background vocals
 Julia Tillman Waters – background vocals
 Lisa Sarna – background vocals

Technical
 Jürgen Koppers – recording, mixing
 John Kovarek – recording
 Brian Gardner – mastering
 Jack White – production
 Greg Mathieson – co-production

Artwork
 Jim Houghton – photography
 Bob Defrin – art direction

Charts

Weekly charts

Year-end charts

Certifications

Notes

References

1982 debut albums
Albums produced by Jack White (music producer)
Atlantic Records albums
Laura Branigan albums